Stilwell High School is a high school (grades 9–12) in Stilwell, Oklahoma, United States.

As of 2006 it had some 615 students, of whom 70% were Native American, and some 38 teachers. The 1988-1989 class was the largest graduating class with a total of 181 graduates. The class of 2009-2010 had the most Honor Students in its graduating class with 22.

Notable alumni 
 Dwight W. Birdwell, Medal of Honor recipient
 Sam Claphan, All American Football Player and NFL Football Player
 Sandy Garrett, former Oklahoma Superintendent of Public Instruction
 Markwayne Mullin, U.S. senator from Oklahoma

External links 
 School Website
 profile at publicschoolreview.com

Public high schools in Oklahoma
Schools in Adair County, Oklahoma